Hijacking may refer to:

Common usage

Computing and technology 
 Bluejacking, the unsolicited transmission of data via Bluetooth
 Brandjacking, the unauthorized use of a company's brand
 Browser hijacking
 Clickjacking (including likejacking and cursorjacking), a phenomenon of hijacking "clicks" in a website context
 DLL hijacking
 DNS hijacking
 Domain hijacking
 Hijack attack, in communication, a form of active wiretapping in which the attacker seizes control of a previously established communication association
 BGP hijacking
 Reverse domain hijacking
 Session hijacking

Finance
 Credit card hijacking

Transportation 
 Aircraft hijacking, the unlawful seizure of an aircraft by an individual or a group
 Carjacking, a robbery in which the item stolen is a motor vehicle
 Maritime hijacking, or piracy

Arts, entertainment, and media 
 Hijacking, in dance, a variation of lead and follow
 A Hijacking, a 2012 Danish film

See also 
 "Hi-jacked", a 1968 episode of Joe 90
 Hijack (disambiguation)
 Hijacked, a 2012 action, crime, thriller film directed by Brandon Nutt and starring Vinnie Jones, Rob Steinberg, and Craig Fairbrass
 Hijacker (comics), three different Marvel Comics characters have used this moniker